This list of artillery by country contains all artillery systems organized primarily by their country of origin. In cases where multiple countries collaborated on a project, a system could be listed under each of the major participants. Also, in outstanding cases where a system was adopted fully by another country, the system may be listed there also. This list is not an attempt to list every artillery system ever used by each country.

 For other categorized lists, see list of artillery by name and list of artillery by type.

 Jump to a specific country in the table below:.



Argentina 
 Field artillery
 Model 1968 105 mm model 1968 recoilless gun
 CITEFA Model 77 Cold War/modern 155 mm gun/howitzer, based on the French 155mm gun mounted on AMX Mk F3 SP gun
 CALA 30 155 mm L45 long range gun
 Self-propelled field artillery
 VCA 155 self-propelled 155 mm howitzer, based on a TAM chassis with a Palmaria turret
 Rocket artillery
 SLAM Pampero 105 mm multiple rocket launcher
 SAC SAPBA 127 mm multiple rocket launcher
 CP-30 127 mm multiple rocket launcher
 VCLC 160 mm or 350 mm multiple rocket launcher
 EDESA Yarará 70 mm multiple rocket launcher

Australia 
 Ordnance QF 25-pounder Short World War II pack howitzer based on British 25 pounder gun-howitzer
 BL 5.5-inch medium gun mid-1940s to 1980s
 L16 81mm mortar
 M101 105 mm towed howitzer (M2A2)
 L119 105mm towed gun
 M198 155 mm howitzer - 1980s to 2000s
 M777 155 mm medium howitzer - 2000s

Self-propelled artillery. 

 K-9 Self-propelled howitzer artillery - Possibly 2022 to future.

Multiple Launching Rocket Systems/Rocket artillery. 
 M142 HIMARS MLRS rocket artillery - 2023 to future.

Austria 
 Mortars
 M6 mortar
Self-propelled Field Artillery
 M109 - 155 mm self-propelled howitzer

Belgium 
 Mortars
 RT F1 120 mm mortar
 Field artillery
 GIAT LG1 105 mm howitzer

Brazil 
Self-propelled field artillery
 M109 howitzer 155 mm self-propelled
 M108 howitzer 105 mm self-propelled

Field artillery
 M114 155 mm howitzer - 155 mm towed
 L119 - 105 mm towed howitzer
 M101 howitzer - 105 mm towed
 M56 - 105 mm towed howitzer
 120mm M2 RAIADO - 120 mm towed mortar
 M936 AGR - 81 mm towed mortar
 M949 AGR - 60 mm light mortar

Multiple Rocket Launchers
 Astros II MLRS - multiple rocket launcher.
 AV-SS 12/36 - light multiple rocket launcher to assist infantry troops.

Canada 
 Field artillery
 GC-45 howitzer 155 mm
 C1 105 mm howitzer
 C3 105 mm howitzer
 L5 105 mm pack howitzer
 LG-1 105 mm howitzer
 M109 self-propelled 155 mm howitzer
 M777 155 mm medium howitzer

 Anti-aircraft guns
 Oerlikon 20 mm cannon

China 
 Anti-aircraft gun
 Type 90 PG99 35 mm anti-aircraft twin-gun
 Self-propelled anti-aircraft gun
 Type 63 anti-aircraft gun
 Type-80: Chinese version of the ZSU-57-2.
 Type 90 (PG99)
 Type 95
 SWS2 anti-aircraft gun/surface-to-air missile
 Towed field artillery
 Type 60 towed 122 mm howitzer
Type 66 152 mm towed gun-howitzer
 Type 59-1 130 mm towed field gun
 Type 89 155 mm howitzer
 Norinco AH4 155mm Howitzer
 Self-propelled field artillery
 Type 54-1 self-propelled 122 mm gun
 Type 83 towed 122 mm howitzer
 Type 83 self-propelled 152 mm gun
 PLZ-07
 PLZ-89
 PLZ-05 self-propelled 155 mm howitzer
 PLZ-45 self-propelled 155 mm howitzer
 Type 83 SPH
 PLZ-08
 Recoilless rifles
 Type 65
 Type 65-1
 Mortars
 Type 67 mortar
 Mortar carriers
 PLL-05
 PLL-08
 WMA029
 Multiple rocket launchers
 Huo Che
 Kung Feng Multiple Launch Rocket System
 WM-80 MRL
 A-100 MRL
 WS-1B multiple rocket launcher
 WS-2D multiple rocket launcher
 Type 63 multiple rocket launcher
 Type 70
 Type 81 (rocket launcher)
 Type 82 artillery
 PHL-96
 PHL-03
 SR-5 — Chinese export 122/220mm MLRS.
 Norinco AR3

Croatia
 Rocket artillery
LRSV-122 M-96 "Tajfun"

Czech Republic and Slovakia 
 Anti-aircraft guns
 Škoda 76.5 mm L/50
 Anti-tank guns
 85 mm vz. 52
 100 mm vz. 53
 Self-propelled anti-aircraft guns
 M53/59 self-propelled twin 30 mm cannon
 BRAMS
 Self-propelled artillery
 155 mm SpGH Zuzana 155 mm self-propelled gun howitzer
 152 mm SpGH DANA self-propelled 152 mm howitzer
Towed siege howitzer Skoda 220 mm howitzer
Light howitzer
 Škoda 7.5 cm d/29 Model 1911
 Škoda 10 cm vz. 38 howitzer
 Self-propelled multiple rocket launcher
 RM-51
 RM-70 multiple rocket launcher

Finland 
 Anti-aircraft guns
 20 ITK 40 VKT - 20 mm twin AA gun
 ZU-23-2 - 23 mm twin AA gun
 Oerlikon GDF - 35 mm twin AA gun
 Bofors 40 Mk.3
 Bofors 57 Mk.3
 Towed field artillery
 105 K 34 - 105 mm towed gun
 152 H 88-31 - 152 mm towed howitzer
 122 K 60 - 122 mm towed gun
 130 K 54 - 130 mm towed gun
 130 K 90-60 - 130 mm towed gun
 152 H 88-40 - 152 mm towed howitzer
 152 H 55 - 152 mm towed howitzer
 152 H 88 - 152 mm towed gun
 152 H 88-37 - 152 mm towed howitzer
 155 K 98 - 155 mm towed gun
 155 K 83 - 155 mm towed gun
 122 H 63 - 122 mm towed howitzer
 152 K 89 - 152 mm towed gun
 Self-propelled artillery
 AMOS - 120 mm twin barreled mortar
 K9FIN Moukari - 155 mm self-propelled howitzer
 122 PSH 74 - 122 mm self-propelled howitzer
 152 TELAK 91 - 152 mm self-propelled gun
 Rocket artillery
 122 RAKH 76
 122 RAKH 91
 227 RAKH 07
 Coastal artillery
 57 55 J
 100 56 TK
 130 53 TK

France 
 Mortars
 Lance Grenades de 50 mm modèle 37
 240 mm trench mortar
 9.45-inch heavy mortar
 Brandt Mle 27/31 used in World War II
 LLR 81mm designed in 1961, current French infantry mortar
 Brandt Mle CM60A1, breech-loading for use in armoured vehicles
 Brandt 60 mm LR Gun-mortar, breech-loading for use in armoured vehicles
 RT F1 120 mm towed heavy mortar

 Self-propelled anti-aircraft guns
 M3 VDA self-propelled twin 20 mm cannon

 Field artillery
 Canon d'Infanterie de 37 modèle 1916 TRP, a rapid firing infantry support gun
 Canon de 65 M (montagne) modele 1906, a mountain gun that could be carried by four mules
 Canon de 75 M(montagne) modele 1919 Schneider, replacement for the mle 1906
 Canon de 75 M(montagne) modele 1928
 Canon de 75 modèle 1897, 75 mm gun, one of the most famous guns of World War I
 Canon de 75 modèle 1912 Schneider, for use by horse artillery
 Canon de 75 modèle 1914 Schneider. longer range version of the modèle 1912 gun
 Reffye 75mm cannon modèle 1873
 De Bange 80 mm cannon modèle 1877
 Reffye 85mm cannon modèle 1870, an early breech-loading gun
 De Bange 90 mm cannon modèle 1877, still in service in World War I
 Lahitolle 95 mm cannon modèle 1875, still in service in World War I
 Canon Court de 105 M(montagne) modele 1909 Schneider
 Canon Court de 105 M(montagne) modèle 1919 Schneider, replacement for the mle 1909
 Canon de 105 L mle 1936 Schneider field gun used in WWII
 Canon de 105 court mle 1934 Schneider howitzer
 Canon de 105 court mle 1935 B howitzer
 Canon de 105 mle 1913 Schneider used in both World Wars
Obusier de 105 modèle 1950
Obusier de 120 mm mle 15TR
 GIAT LG1
 Canon de 145 L modele 1916 Saint-Chamond conversion of a Naval Gun to Field Gun
 152 mm howitzer M1910 Russian gun designed by Schneider
 Canon de 155 C modèle 1915 St. Chamond howitzer
 Canon de 155 C modèle 1917 Schneider howitzer
 Canon de 155 L Modele 1917 Schneider
 Canon de 155 L modele 1916 Saint-Chamond rebored Canon de 145 L modele 1916 Saint-Chamond
 Canon de 155 L modèle 1877/14 Schneider
 Canon de 155 L modèle 1918 Schneider
 Canon de 155mm GPF modèle 1917, the standard French heavy gun into WWII
 De Bange 155 mm cannon the French artillery piece that debuted the 155 mm caliber in widespread use today, still in service in WWI
 Obusier de 155 mm Modèle 50 post-war howitzer
 Rimailho Model 1904TR quick-firing howitzer used in WWI
 TRF1 155 mm howitzer introduced in 1990
 Canon de 19 C modèle 1870/93 coastal artillery
 Canon de 19 C modèle 1875 coastal artillery
 Mortier de 220 mm TR mle 1915/1916
 Canon de 220 L mle 1917
 Mortier de 280 modèle 1914 Schneider heavy siege howitzer

 Self-propelled artillery

 Mk 61 105 mm Self-Propelled Howitzer
 Mk F3 155mm self-propelled gun/howitzer in service 1962-1977
 GCT 155mm designed in 1976 to replace the Mk F3
 CAESAR self-propelled 155 mm gun
Canon de 194 mle GPF, the first French self-propelled gun, used in WWI
Mortier 280 mm TR de Schneider sur affût-chenilles St Chamond

 Naval artillery
 Paixhans guns nineteenth-century naval guns
 Canon de 305 mm Modèle 1887

 Railroad artillery
 Canon de 19 modèle 1870/93 TAZ
 Canon de 164 modèle 1893/96 TAZ
 24 cm Canon G modèle 1916
 Canon de 274 modèle 93/96 Berceau
 Canon de 274 modèle 87/93 Glissement
 Canon de 305 modèle 93/96 TAZ
 Canon de 32 modèle 1870/93
 Obusier de 370 modèle 1915
 Canon de 370 modèle 75/79 Glissement
 Obusier de 400 Modèle 1915/1916
 Obusier de 520 modèle 1916

Georgia 
 Rocket artillery
 ZCRS-122 multiple rocket launcher firing 122mm rockets. It was developed in 2011

Germany

1870 to 1919 
 Batteries (Naval artillery)
 Batterie Pommern World War I 380 mm gun

 Siege artillery
 Big Bertha 420 mm howitzer
 Paris Gun World War I 210 mm gun

 Mortars
25 cm schwerer Minenwerfer

1920 to 1945 

 Infantry guns
 7.5 cm leichtes Infanteriegeschütz 18
 15 cm sIG 33

 Artillery
 10.5 cm leFH 18
 10.5 cm sK 18/40
 15 cm sFH 02
 15 cm sFH 18
 17 cm Kanone 18
 21 cm Kanone 38
 21 cm Mörser 16
 21 cm Mörser 18
 28 cm Haubitze L/12
 42 cm Gamma Mörser
 35.5 cm Haubitze M1
 Schwerer Gustav

 Anti-aircraft guns
 2 cm Flakvierling 38 quadruple anti-aircraft gun
 2 cm FlaK 30 anti-aircraft gun
 2 cm Fliegerabwehrkanone 30 anti-aircraft gun
 2 cm Fliegerabwehrkanone 38 anti-aircraft gun
 20 mm C/30 World War II naval anti-aircraft gun
 3.7 cm SK C/30
 3.7 cm FlaK 43 anti-aircraft gun
 8.8 cm Flak 18/36/37/41 anti-aircraft gun
 10.5 cm FlaK 38 anti-aircraft gun
 12.8 cm Flak 40 anti-aircraft gun

 Anti-tank guns
 3.7 cm Pak 36
 5 cm Pak 38
 7.5 cm Pak 40
 8.8 cm Pak 43
 8 cm PAW 600

 Dual-use gun
 88 mm gun-a popular calibre for a series of anti-aircraft and anti-tank guns

 Railway Artillery
 21 cm K 12 (E)
 28 cm schwere Bruno Kanone (E)
 Schwerer Gustav

Rocket Artillery
 8 cm Raketen-Vielfachwerfer

Mortars
 5 cm Granatwerfer 36
 8 cm Granatwerfer 34
 Kz 8 cm GrW 42
 10 cm Nebelwerfer 35
 10 cm Nebelwerfer 40
 12 cm Granatwerfer 42
 20 cm leichter Ladungswerfer
 21 cm Granatwerfer 69
 38 cm schwerer Ladungswerfer

 Mortar Carriers
 Karl-Gerät
 Reihenwerfer

 See also
 German designations of foreign artillery in World War II

1946 to present 

 Anti-aircraft guns
 Rheinmetall 20 mm Twin Anti-Aircraft Cannon
 Self-propelled anti-aircraft guns
 Gepard twin 35 mm self-propelled anti-aircraft gun system
 Field artillery
 FH-70 155 mm howitzer in service with the Bundeswehr 1978 til 31-01-2002
 Self-propelled artillery
 M-109 155 mm self-propelled howitzer of US origin
 Panzerhaubitze 2000 155 mm self-propelled howitzer
 Tank guns
 LTA2 105 mm tank gun
 Rheinmetall 120 mm gun smoothbore tank gun

Greece 
 Anti-aircraft guns
 Artemis 30 2x30mm anti-aircraft gun

Hungary 
 Howitzers
 105 mm MÁVAG 40/43M

India 
 Mortars
 OFB E1 51 mm mortar
 L16 81mm mortar
 Ordnance ML 4.2 inch mortar

 120 mm E1 light mortar
 81 mm mortars for infantry
 160 mm mortars in reserve

 Howitzers
 105/37mm Indian field gun
 155/39mm Haubits FH77
 155/45mm Dhanush howitzer
 155/39mm M777 howitzer
 155/52mm DRDO Advanced Towed Artillery Gun System (ATAGS)
 122 mm howitzer 2A18 (D-30)
 155/45mm Bharat 45
 155/52mm Bharat 52
 155/39mm MARG-T/S
 155/52mm ULH ER
 155/45mm Sharang

 Mortar Carrier
 Carrier Mortar Tracked

 Coastal Defence
 Middle Ground Coastal Battery (Historical)

 Heavy Gun
 180 mm gun S-23

 Recoilless rifle
 Carl Gustaf 8.4 cm recoilless rifle (RCL MK 2 & RCL MK 3)
 M40 recoilless rifle

 Anti-tank gun
 85 mm anti-tank gun D-48

 Field gun
 BL 5.5-inch medium gun (reserve)
 100 mm field gun M1944 (BS-3)
 Indian field gun MK 1/2/3
 130 mm towed field gun M1954 (M-46)
 Indian field gun

 Anti-aircraft guns
 ZU-23-2
 AZP S-60
 KPV heavy machine gun
 All Weather Air Defence Gun System (AWADGS)
 40 mm Bofors L/70 anti-aircraft gun (upgraded variant)
 40 mm Bofors L/60 anti-aircraft gun (upgraded variant)

 Self-propelled anti-aircraft gun
 ZSU Shilka
 2K22 Tunguska

 Mountain guns
 2.75 inch (70 mm) mountain gun (World War I)
 75 mm/24 Pounder Indian mountain gun
 76 mm mountain gun
 88 mm mountain gun
 94 mm 3.7-inch mountain howitzer (Reserved)

 Self-propelled artillery
 155/52mm Bhim self-propelled howitzer
 155/52mm K9 Thunder (Vajra)
 155/52mm Bharat 52 (155 mm Truck Mounted SPH)
 155/52mm Tata Mounted Gun System (MGS)
 OFB 105mm SPG (tracked)
 122mm M-46 Catapult (tracked)
 2S1 Gvozdika
 FV433 Abbot SPG
 155/52mm OFB Mounted Gun System
 155/39mm Marg-S Mounted Gun System 
 105/37mm Garuda V2
 105/37mm IFB Mounted Gun System

 Rocket artillery
 BM-21 Grad
 Pinaka multi-barrel rocket launcher
 BM-30 Smerch

Missile artillery 
 BrahMos missile system
 Agni missile system
 Prithvi missile system
 Prahaar missile
 Pralay missile
 Shaurya missile

Indonesia 
 Anti-aircraft guns
 DShK 12.7mm heavy anti-aircraft machine gun
 Rheinmetall 20mm twin anti-aircraft cannon
 Zastava M55 A2 20mm Triple-barreled automatic anti-aircraft gun
 ZUR-23-2 kg-I twin 23mm Anti-Aircraft Cannon
 Norinco Type 85 Giant Bow II 23mm Twin Anti-aircraft Cannon
 Norinco Type 85 Shengong Air Defense System
 Type 90 twin 35mm anti-aircraft gun
 Oerlikon Skyshield 35mm air defense system
 M1939 61-K 37mm automatic anti-aircraft gun
 Bofors L/70 40mm anti-aircraft gun
 AZP S-60 57mm anti-aircraft gun
 CNPMIEC TD-2000B air defense system
 Mortars
 Pindad 40mm silent mortar
 Pindad Mo-1 60mm mortar
 Pindad Mo-2 60mm mortar
 Pindad Mo-3 81mm mortar
 Norinco Type W87 81mm mortar
 M1938 120mm mortar
 Self-propelled mortar
 Anoa mortar carrier 81mm self-propelled mortar
 Towed artillery
 M48 76mm mountain gun
 GIAT LG1 mk.II 105 mm light howitzer
 M2A1 105mm towed howitzer
 KH178 105mm towed howitzer
 M1938 (M-30) 122mm towed howitzer
 FH-2000 155mm towed howitzer
 KH179 155mm towed howitzer
 Self-propelled artillery
 AMX Mk61 105mm Self-propelled Howitzer
 CAESAR 155mm Self-propelled Howitzer
 M109A4-BE 155mm Self-propelled Howitzer
 Rocket artillery
 NDL-40 70mm Multiple Rocket Towed Launcher
 R-Han 122 122mm Multiple Rocket Launcher
 RM-70 122mm Multiple Rocket Launcher
 RM-70 Vampir 122mm Multiple Rocket Launcher
 Type 90B 122mm Multiple Rocket Launcher
 M-51 140mm Multiple Rocket Launcher
 Astros II Mk.6 300mm Multiple Rocket Launcher

Iran 
 Anti-aircraft guns
 ZU-23 twin 23 mm anti-aircraft cannon
 Mesbah 1
 Samavat 35 mm twin anti-aircraft cannon
 Sa'ir 100 mm air defense gun KS-19
 Field artillery
 122 mm howitzer 2A18 (D-30)
 Howitzer 155 mm HM-41
 Self-propelled artillery
 Raad-1
 Raad-2
 Koksan
 Anti-tank guns
 2A45 Sprut-B 125 mm anti-tank gun.
 Rocket artillery
 Samid
 Falaq-1
 Falaq-2
 Fajr-1
 Fajr-2
 Fajr-3
 Fajr-5
 HM 20
 Tondar-69
 Shahin-II
 Arash
 Oghab
 Naze'at
 Zelzal-1
 Zelzal-2
 Zelzal-3
 Mortars
 37mm marsh mortar
 60 mm HM 12
 60 mm HM 13
 60 mm HM 14
 81 mm HM 15
 120 mm HM 16

Israel 
 Field artillery
 Soltam M-68
 Soltam M-71
 L-33 155 mm howitzer
 Self-propelled artillery
 Rascal 155 mm howitzer
 Doher Improved M109AL 155 mm howitzer
 ATMOS 2000 155 mm howitzer
 Rocket artillery
 LAR-160 160 mm x 36 tubes rocket launcher
 MAR-240 240 mm x 36 rails rocket launcher
 MAR-290 290 mm x 4 rails rocket launcher
 Mortars
Soltam K5
Soltam K6

Italy 
 Anti-aircraft guns
 Breda 35 20 mm automatic cannon
 Breda L/70 40 mm anti-aircraft gun
 SIDAM 25 self-propelled quad 25 mm cannon
 SIDAM 35 self-propelled twin 35 mm cannon
 Draco 76-mm self-propelled anti-aircraft gun
 Mountain artillery
 65 mm mountain gun
 Cannone da 70/15
 Cannone da 75/27 modello 11
 Field artillery
 Cannone da 75/27 modello 06
 Model 56 (simplified name for the OTO Melara Mod 56)
 Obice da 75/18 modello 34 75 mm howitzer
 FH-70 155 mm howitzer
Obice da 149/12
 Obice da 210/22 210 mm howitzer
Mortaio da 260/9 Modello 16
 Obice da 305/17 305 mm coastal defense and siege howitzer
 Siege Gun Model 1877 149 mm gun
 Self-propelled artillery
 Palmaria self-propelled 155 mm howitzer
 PzH 2000 155 mm self-propelled howitzer

Japan 
 Anti-aircraft guns
 Type 99 88 mm AA gun
 Self-propelled anti-aircraft guns
 Type 87 self-propelled anti-aircraft gun (35 mm cannon)
 Infantry guns
 Type 11 37 mm infantry gun
 Type 92 battalion gun (70 mm)
 Field artillery
 Type 35 Gun 75 mm, WW2 and before
 Type 91 10 cm howitzer
 Self-propelled artillery
 Type 60 Self-propelled 106 mm Recoilless Gun (1956)
 Type 74 105 mm self-propelled howitzer (1974)
 Type 75 155 mm self-propelled howitzer (1975)
 Type 99 155 mm self-propelled howitzer (1985)
 Type 19 155 mm Wheeled Self-propelled Howitzer
 Rocket systems
 Type 67 Model 30 Rocket Artillery 307 mm
 Type 75 130 mm Multiple Rocket Launcher being replaced by
 M270 Multiple Launch Rocket System

Mexico 
 M198 155 mm gun-Howitzer
 M101 105 mm towed Howitzer
 OTO Melara Mod 56 105 mm towed Howitzer
 TRF1 155 mm Gun-Howitzer
 Bofors 40mm gun 40mm anti-aircraft autocannon

Myanmar

Self-propelled artillery

 MAM-01 :122 mm multiple launch rocket system.
 MAM-02 :240 mm multiple launch rocket system.

Netherlands 
 Field Guns
 7-veld & Siderius M 02/04
 Mortars
 RT F1 120 mm mortar
 Self-propelled artillery
 PzH 2000 NL

New Zealand 
 60mm M6 mortar
 81 mm mortar, serving in Royal New Zealand Artillery
 L118 light gun 105mm towed, phased out December 2000
 L119 105mm towed gun, serving in Royal New Zealand Artillery

Norway 
 Self-propelled artillery
 M 109 A3GN self-propelled howitzer, Norwegian version of M 109, in use: 1969-present
 Archer truck-mounted 155mm FH77 Swedish howitzer, test unit ordered in 2008
 Rocket artillery
 M270 Multiple Launch Rocket System (temporarily taken out of service, future status under evaluation in 2009 )

Pakistan 
 FATAH-1 300mm Guided Multiple Launch Rocket System
 KRL-122

Philippines 
 OTO Melara Mod 56 light howitzer
 M101 howitzer, some upgraded by GIAT
 M102 105 mm howitzer
 M114 155 mm howitzer
 Soltam M71 155mm howitzer

Palestine/Hamas 
 Rocket artillery
 Al Quds 3

Poland 
 Nkm wz.38 FK - 20 mm anti-tank autocannon
 Bofors 37 mm - an antitank gun used by Poles in the "37 mm pattern 36" or "37mm wz.36"
 75 mm armata wz.36 - 75 mm anti-aircraft gun
 Armata 75 mm wz.02/26 - 75 mm field gun
 105 mm Armata wz. 29 - 105 mm field gun
 120 mm Armata wz. 78/09/31 - 120 mm field gun
 WR-40 Langusta - 122 mm rocket system
 AHS Krab - 155 mm self-propelled howitzer
 2S1 Gvozdika Goździk - 122 mm self-propelled howitzer
 M-98 mortar - 98 mm
 PZA Loara - 2x35 mm self-propelled AA gun
 ZSU-23-4 Shilka - 4x23 mm self-propelled AA gun
 ZU-23-2 - 2x23 mm AA gun
 ZSU-23-4MP Biała

Portugal 
Field artillery
OTO Melara Mod 56 105mm towed gun
M101 105mm towed gun
L118 105mm towed gun
M114 155mm towed gun
Obusier de 15 cm TR Schneider-Canet-du-Bocage
Self-propelled artillery
M109 A5 self-propelled howitzer

Romania 
 Model 1977 towed 100 mm anti-tank gun T-12
 Model 1989 122 mm howitzer-selfpropeld 2S1 Gvozdika
 ATROM 155mm gun-selfpropeld ATMOS 2000
 Model 1981 152 mm towed howitzer 152 mm towed gun-howitzer M1955 (D-20)
 Model 1985 152 mm towed gun-howitzer 152 mm howitzer 2A65
 Model 1982 120 mm towed mortar 120-PM-43 mortar
 Model 1981 130 mm towed gun 130 mm towed field gun M1954 (M-46)
 Model 1977 82 mm towed mortar 82-PM-41
 Model 1982 76 mm towed gun 76 mm regimental gun M1943
 Model 1938 122 mm towed howitzer 122 mm howitzer M1938 (M-30)
 AG-9 73 mm SPG-9
 85 mm anti-tank gun D-48
 76 mm divisional gun M1939 (USV)
 76 mm divisional gun M1942 (ZiS-3)
 LAROM rocket artillery 122mm*40 and 160mm*26
 HIMARS rocket artillery 227mm*6

Republic of Korea (South Korea) 
Self-propelled mortar
 K281A1 81mm Self-Propelled Mortar
 K242A1 107mm Self-Propelled Mortar
 Hanwha 120mm Self-propelled mortar
Towed artillery
 KH178 105 mm towed artillery
 KH179 155 mm towed artillery
Self-propelled artillery
 K105A1 105 mm self-propelled artillery
 K55 155 mm self-propelled artillery
 K9 Thunder 155 mm self-propelled artillery
Multiple rocket launcher
 K136 130 mm multiple rocket launcher
 K239
 M270 Multiple Launch Rocket System (MLRS)

People's Democratic Republic of Korea (North Korea) 
 Self-propelled artillery
M-1978 Koksan
 Rocket artillery
KN-09 (MRL)

Serbia 
 Recoilless gun
 M60 recoilless gun
 Field artillery
 M-56 Howitzer
 M-46 The 130 mm towed field gun M1954
 Field gun-howitzer M84 NORA The 152 mm and 155mm field gun-howitzer
 Self-propelled artillery
 2S1 Gvozdika self-propelled howitzer
 Nora B-52 self-propelled rocket artillery
 M-77 Oganj rocket artillery
 M-87 Orkan rocket artillery
 LRSVM Morava rocket artillery

Singapore 
Self-propelled mortars
M106 – a 120 mm mortar equipped variant of the M113 armored personnel carrier
Bronco ATTC Mortar tracked carrier – 120 mm mortar equipped variant of the Bronco ATTC
Field artillery
FH-88 – 155 mm/39-cal field howitzer
FH-2000 – 155 mm/52-cal field howitzer
Self-propelled artillery
SSPH-1 Primus – 155 mm/39-cal self-propelled howitzer
SLWH Pegasus – 155 mm/39-cal heli-portable lightweight self-propelled howitzer

South Africa 
 Mortars
 M10 60mm mortar
 Field artillery
 G5 155 mm howitzer
 G7 105 mm howitzer
 Self-propelled mortars
 Ratel 81 self-propelled 81 mm mortar

 Self-propelled artillery
 G6 self-propelled 155 mm howitzer
 T6 self-propelled 155 mm howitzer
Truck mounted artillery
 T5-52 155mm self-propelled howitzer
 Rocket artillery
 Valkiri self-propelled multiple rocket launcher

Soviet Union 
 Anti-aircraft guns
 76 mm air defense gun M1931
 76 mm air defense gun M1938
 85 mm air defense gun M1939 (52-K)
 37 mm automatic air defense gun M1939 (61-K)
 25 mm automatic air defense gun M1940 (72-K)
 45 mm anti-aircraft gun (21-K)
 100 mm air defense gun KS-19
 130 mm air defense gun KS-30
 AZP S-60 57 mm anti-aircraft gun
 ZPU dual or quad 14.5 mm anti-aircraft machine gun
 ZU-23-2 twin 23 mm anti-aircraft cannon
 Self-propelled anti-aircraft guns
 ZSU-37
 ZSU-57-2 self-propelled twin 57 mm cannon
 ZSU-23-4 Shilka self-propelled quad 23 mm cannon
 ZSU-37-2 Yenisei self-propelled dual 37mm cannons, main competitor of Shilka
 2K22 Tunguska self-propelled twin 30 mm cannon
 Anti-tank guns
 37 mm anti-tank gun M1930 (1-K)
 45 mm anti-tank gun M1932 (19-K)
 45 mm anti-tank gun M1937 (53-K)
 76 mm tank gun M1940 F-34
 76 mm tank gun M1941 (ZiS-5)
 45 mm anti-tank gun M1942 (M-42)
 57 mm anti-tank gun M1943 (ZiS-2)
 ZiS-30
 100 mm field gun M1944 (BS-3)
 SU-85
 D-10 tank gun
 85 mm anti-tank gun D-48
 100 mm anti-tank gun T-12
 Sprut anti-tank gun
 Assault guns
 ASU-57 57 mm self-propelled gun
 ASU-85 85 mm self-propelled gun
 Recoilless rifles
 RPG-2
 B-10 recoilless rifle
 B-11 recoilless rifle
 SPG-9
 Mortars
 RM-38
 152 mm mortar M1931 (NM)
 107mm M1938 mortar
 M1938 mortar
 160mm Mortar M1943
 M31, M68 82 mm mortar
 82-BM-37
 37mm spade mortar
 82-PM-41
 120-PM-43 mortar
 240 mm mortar M240
 2B11
 2S12 Sani
 2B14 Podnos
 Mortar carriers
 2S23 Nona-SVK-120mm
 2S4 Tyulpan-240mm heavy self-propelled mortar.
 Assault guns
 SU-122
 SU-152
 ISU-152
 ISU-122
 SU-122-54
 Field artillery
 95 mm howitzer M1753 secret howitzer
 6-inch siege gun M1877
 76 mm divisional gun M1902
 76 mm divisional gun M1902/30
 6-inch siege gun M1904
 37 mm trench gun M1915
 305 mm howitzer M1915
 76 mm divisional gun M1936 (F-22)
 76 mm divisional gun M1939 (USV)
 76 mm divisional gun M1942 (ZiS-3)
 100 mm field gun M1944 (BS-3)
 107 mm gun M1910
 107 mm gun M1910/30
 107 mm divisional gun M1940 (M-60)
 122 mm howitzer M1909
 122 mm howitzer M1910
 122 mm howitzer M1910/30
 122 mm howitzer M1909/37
 122 mm gun M1931 (A-19)
 122 mm gun M1931/37 (A-19)
 122 mm howitzer M1938 (M-30)
 152 mm howitzer M1909
 152 mm howitzer M1909/30
 152 mm siege gun M1910
 152 mm gun M1910/30
 152 mm gun M1910/34
 152 mm howitzer M1910/37
 152 mm gun M1935 (Br-2)
 152 mm howitzer-gun M1937 (ML-20)
 152 mm howitzer M1938 (M-10)
 152 mm howitzer M1943 (D-1)
 152 mm L/27 howitzer D-22 (2A33)
 D-74 122 mm field gun
 152 mm towed gun-howitzer M1955 (D-20)
 122 mm howitzer 2A18 (D-30)
 D-74 122 mm field gun
 M1938 M-30 122 mm howitzer
 M1954 M-46 130 mm gun
 152 mm howitzer-gun M1937 (ML-20)
 130 mm towed field gun M1954 (M-46)
 M1955 D-20 152 mm gun/howitzer
 M-389 155 mm gun
 203 mm howitzer M1931 (B-4)
 S-23 180–203 mm gun
 210 mm gun M1939 (Br-17)
 305 mm howitzer M1939 (Br-18)
 152 mm howitzer 2A65
 2B16 Nona-K
 2B9 Vasilek 82 mm gun-mortar
 76 mm divisional gun M1933
 Self-propelled artillery
 2S7 Pion
 2A36 Giatsint-B
 2S3 Akatsiya
 2A3 Kondensator 2P
 2B1 Oka
 130 mm coastal defense gun A-222
 Rocket artillery
 Katyusha rocket launcher (BM-8, BM-13, BM-31)
 BM-14
 BM-21 Grad
 BM-24
 2K6 Luna
 9K52 Luna-M
 9K57 Uragan 220 mm multiple rocket launcher
 9K58 Smerch 300 mm multiple rocket launcher
 9K59 Prima 122 mm multiple rocket launcher
 TOS-1 220mm multiple rocket launcher

Russian Empire and Russian Federation

Russian Empire 

 37 mm McClean Automatic Cannon Mk. III
152 mm 45 caliber Pattern 1892

Post-Soviet Russian Federation 
 Anti-aircraft guns
AZP S-60
Derivatsiya-PVO 57mm anti-aircraft artillery system

 Anti-tank guns
 100 mm anti-tank gun T-12 2A19, 2A29 MT-12 Rapira
 2S9 Nona 2B16
 Sprut anti-tank gun 2A45 Sprut-B 125 mm
 2S25 Sprut-SD
 Mortars
 2B14-1 Podnos 82 mm mortar
 2B16 Nona-K 120 mm gun/mortar
 2B24
 2B25
 2K32
 Mortar carriers
 2S4 Tyulpan
 2S31 Vena
 2S42 Lotus
 Phlox 120mm self-propelled artillery
 Zauralets-D
 Field artillery
 2A6 152 mm howitzer
 152 mm towed gun-howitzer M1955 (D-20)
 2A18 D-30 122 mm howitzer
 2A36 Giatsint-B 152 mm gun
 2A65 MSTA-B 152 mm howitzer
 2B16 Nona-K
 Self-propelled artillery
 2S1 Gvozdika/M1974 122 mm amphibious howitzer
 2S3 Akatsiya/M1973: 152 mm self-propelled howitzer
 2S4 Tyulpan 240 mm self-propelled mortar
 2S5 Giatsint-S 152 mm self-propelled gun
 2S7 Pion 203 mm self-propelled gun
 2S7M Malka 203 mm self-propelled gun
 2S9 Nona-S 120 mm self-propelled gun/mortar
 2S12 Sani 120 mm mortar
 2S19 MSTA-S 152 mm self-propelled howitzer
 2S23 Nona-SVK 120 mm gun self-propelled gun/mortar
 2S31 Vena 120 mm self-propelled gun
 2S34 Hosta 120 mm
 Phlox 120mm self-propelled artillery
 Zauralets-D
 2S35 Koalitsiya-SV 152.4mm
 Rocket artillery
 9K51 Grad 122 mm multiple rocket launcher
 9K52 Luna-M
 9K57 Uragan 220 mm multiple rocket launcher
 9K58 Smerch 300 mm multiple rocket launcher
 TOS-1 220mm multiple rocket launcher
 9A52-4 Tornado

Spain 
 S88-1 howitzer 155 mm
 M109 howitzer self-propelled 155 mm
 M110 howitzer self-propelled 203 mm
 L118 light gun 105 mm
 OTO Melara Mod 56 105 mm lightweight howitzer
 APU SBT 155 mm towed howitzer
 Teruel MRL

Sri Lanka 
 Anti-aircraft guns
 QF 3.7 inch AA gun (Decommissioned)
 L40 
 ZSU-23-2 
 TCM-20

 Mountain guns
 76 mm mountain gun M48 - (Ceremonial Colour Gun)

 Mortars
 Type 84 (W84) 82 mm mortar
 Type 86 (W86) 120 mm mortar

 Field artillery
 BL 12-pounder 6 cwt gun (Decommissioned)
 QF 25 pounder howitzer - (Ceremonial Gun Battery)
 122 mm Type 60 howitzer
 130 mm Type 59 field gun
 152 mm Type 66 gun-howitzer

Rocket artillery
 RM-70 Multiple rocket launcher

 Coastal artillery
 BL 6 inch Mk VII naval gun (Decommissioned)
 BL 9.2-inch naval gun (Decommissioned)

Sweden 
 M/40 Automatic cannon World War II 20 mm Anti-aircraft and Antitank gun
 Automatkanon m/45 World War II 20 mm Aircraft gun
 Bofors 25 mm M/32 World War II 25 mm Anti-aircraft gun
 Pansarvärnskanon m/34 Inter-war 37 mm Antitank gun
 Pansarvärnskanon m/38 Inter-war 37 mm Antitank gun
 Pansarvärnskanon m/39 m/40 World War II 37 mm Antitank gun
 Bofors 40 mm Automatic Gun L/60 World War II 40 mm Anti-aircraft gun primarily used outside Sweden
 Luftvärnsautomatkanon m/36 World War II 40 mm Anti-aircraft gun
 Luftvärnsautomatkanon m/48 World War II 40 mm Anti-aircraft gun
 Automatkanon m/47 World War II 57 mm Aircraft gun
 Luftvärnsautomatkanon m/54 Cold War 57 mm Anti-aircraft gun
 Pansarvärnskanon m/43 World War II 57 mm Antitank gun
 Kanon m/05 Pre–World War I 75 mm Naval gun
 Kanon m/40 World War II 75 mm gun
 Bergskanon L-20 Inter-war 75 mm pack gun
 Luftvärnskanon m/30 Inter-war 75 mm Anti-aircraft gun
 Luftvärnskanon m/36 Inter-war 75 mm Anti-aircraft gun
 Luftvärnskanon m/37 Inter-war 75 mm Anti-aircraft gun
 Tornpjäs m/57 Cold War 75 mm fixed Coastal Artillery gun
 Haubits m/10 Pre–World War I 105 mm howitzer
 Bergshaubits m/10-24 Inter-war 105 mm Pack howitzer
 Kanon m/27 Inter-war 105 mm gun
 Kanon m/34 Inter-war 105 mm gun
 Haubits m/39 World War II 105 mm howitzer
 Haubits m/40 World War II 105 mm howitzer
 Läderkanon 17th century experimental gun
 Luftvärnskanon m/42 World War II 105 mm Anti-aircraft gun
 Haubits 4140 Cold War 105 mm howitzer
 Tornautomatpjäs m/50 Cold War 105 mm fixed Coastal Artillery gun
 Luftvärnsautomatkanon 4501 Cold War 120 mm Anti-aircraft gun
 Fästningshaubits m/06 Pre–World War I 150 mm Turret-mounted Fortress Howitzer
 Positionshaubits m/06 Pre–World War I 150 mm howitzer
 Haubits m/19 Inter-war 150 mm howitzer
 Haubits m/38 World War II 150 mm howitzer
 Kanon m/98B Pre–World War I 152 mm Coast Artillery Gun
 Kustartilleripjäs m/37 World War II 152 mm Coast Artillery Gun
 Kanon m/03 Pre–World War I 152 mm Fortress Artillery/Coast Artillery Gun
 Kanon m/12 Pre–World War I 152 mm Fortress Artillery/Coast Artillery Gun
 Kustartilleripjäs M/51 Cold War 152 mm Coast Artillery Gun
 Tornautomatpjäs 12/70 Cold War 120 mm Fixed Coast Artillery Gun
 Kustartilleripjäs 12/80 Cold War 120 mm mobile Coast Artillery Gun
 Haubits F Cold War 155 mm howitzer Howitzer
 Bandkanon 1 Cold War Self-propelled 155 mm gun
 Haubits FH77/A Cold War 155 mm howitzer
 Haubits FH77/B Cold War 155 mm howitzer
 Archer Self-propelled 155 mm howitzer
 21 cm kanon m/42 World War II mobile Coast Artillery Gun
 Kanon m/92 Pre–World War I 240 mm Coast Defense Gun
 Haubits m/94 Pre–World War I 240 mm Coast Defense howitzer
 Haubits m/16 World War I 305 mm (12 inch) Coast Artillery Howitzer
 Regementskanon 17th century 3-pound cannon
 AT4
 Carl Gustaf 8.4 cm recoilless rifle
 Bofors 57 mm gun
 Archer Artillery System

Switzerland 
 20 mm Oerlikon Light AA gun
 Oerlikon GAI-BO1 Light AA gun
 Skyshield 35 mm portable anti-aircraft gun and missile system.
 M109 155 mm self-propelled howitzer (PzHb 79/95 and PzHb 88/95 KAWEST).
 Mw 74 120 mm mortar.
 Mw 87 120 mm mortar.
 Oerlikon GDF

Syria 
 Rocket artillery
 Khaibar-1
 Golan-1000

Republic of China 
Multiple rocket launcher
Kung Feng VI – 117 mm Tracked MLRS
Thunderbolt-2000 - Wheeled MLRS
Field artillery
M101 howitzer – 105 mm Towed Howitzer
155 mm Long Tom – 155 mm Towed Howitzer
M114 howitzer – 155 mm Towed Howitzer
M115 howitzer – 203 mm Towed Howitzer
240 mm howitzer M1 – 240mm Fixed/Towed Howitzer
Self-propelled artillery
M108 howitzer – 105 mm Self-Propelled Howitzer
M109 howitzer – 155 mm Self-Propelled Howitzer
M110 howitzer – 203 mm Self-Propelled Howitzer

Thailand 
 Mortars
 M121A1/A2 mortar 60 mm mortar
 M121A3 Commando mortar 60 mm mortar
 M221A2 mortar 81 mm mortar
 M132A1 mortar 120 mm mortar
 M361 ATMM 120mm Mortar
 Field artillery
 Type 63 field gun 75 mm
 M618A2 105 mm towed howitzer
 GIAT LG1 (LG1 Mk.3) 105 mm towed howitzer
 M101 Mod 105 mm towed howitzer
 L119 105mm howitzer
 M198 155mm howitzer
 GHN-45 155mm howitzer

 Self-propelled field artillery
 M425 SPG 105 mm self-propelled howitzer
 M-71 Soltam SPG 155 mm self-propelled howitzer
 M109A5 155 mm self-propelled howitzer
 CAESAR 155 mm self-propelled howitzer
 ATMOS 2000 (M758 ATMG) 155mm

 Multiple rocket launchers
 D11A Multi-Purpose multiple rocket launcher
 DTI-1 302 mm multiple rocket launcher
 DTI-1G 302 mm multiple rocket launcher
 DTI-2 122 mm multiple rocket launcher
 SR-4 122 mm multiple rocket launcher

Turkey 
 M101A1 : 830
 M114A1 : 535
 M115 : 162
 M116
 M102
 Panter (howitzer) : 225
 M52 : 362
 M44 : 164
 M107 : 36
 M55 : 159
 T-155 Fırtına : 240
 M270 : 12
 T-300 Kasırga : 80
 RA 7040 : 24
 T-122 Sakarya : 130+
 T-107 MBRL : 100+
 TOROS 230
 TOROS 260

United Kingdom 
 QF 1-pounder pom-pom
 QF 3.7-inch AA gun
 120 mm BAT recoilless rifle
 1.59 inch Breech-Loading Vickers Q.F. Gun, Mk II, commonly called the "Vickers-Crayford rocket gun," light field gun designed for infantry use in World War I, later adapted for use as an aircraft gun
 Ordnance QF 2 pounder early World War II anti-tank gun
 Ordnance QF 6 pounder World War II anti-tank gun
 Ordnance BL 12-pounder 7 cwt a turn of the century field gun, and basis for the development of the BL 15-pounder gun
 BL 12-pounder 6 cwt gun a variant of the BL 12-pounder 7 cw adapted for cordite propellant
 Ordnance QF 13 pounder World War I horse artillery & later anti-aircraft gun
 BL 15-pounder gun turn of the century field gun
 Ordnance BLC 15 pounder early World War I field gun (the BL 15-pounder gun adapted with a recoil buffer and recuperator similar to the 13-pounder)
 Ordnance QF 17 pounder World War II anti-tank & tank gun
 Ordnance QF 18 pounder World War I field gun
 Ordnance QF 25 pounder World War II gun/howitzer
 BL 4.5-inch medium field gun early World War II
 BL 5.5-inch medium gun
 BL 6-inch 30 cwt howitzer
 BL 6-inch 26 cwt howitzer
 QF 4.5-inch howitzer World War I field gun
 QF 4.7-inch Mk I – IV naval gun converted to use as field gun in Second Boer Wa, early WWI
 BL 5-inch howitzer early World War I field gun
 BL 60-pounder gun World War I, medium
 BL 5.5-inch medium gun World War II
 BL 6-inch Mk VII naval gun on traveling carriage, World War I
 BL 6-inch gun Mk XIX World War I, long range
 BL 6-inch 30 cwt howitzer World War I, medium
 BL 6-inch 26 cwt howitzer World Wars I & II, medium
 BL 7.2-inch howitzer early World War II, heavy
 BL 8-inch howitzer Mk I – V World War I, heavy using bored-out 6 inch naval gun barrel
 BL 8-inch howitzer Mk VI – VIII World Wars I & II, heavy
 BL 9.2-inch Mk I – VII naval gun family of black powder naval and coast defence, in service from 1881 to the end of World War I
 BL 9.2-inch Mk VIII naval gun designed for newer cordite propellants, first British wire-wound gun of this calibre
 BL 9.2-inch Mk IX – X naval gun rifled, used in successive marks from the 1880s for naval, railway, and coastal artillery; coastal served until 1956
 BL 9.2 inch Mk XI naval gun gun introduced in 1908 increased bore length of Mk X to increase velocity further, but was unsuccessful in service and phased out by 1920
 BL 9.2 inch Howitzer World War I siege howitzer
 BL 12 inch Howitzer World War I siege howitzer
 BL 15 inch Howitzer World War I siege howitzer
 RML 6.3 inch Howitzer Second Boer War howitzer
 FH-70 155 mm gun
 M777 155 mm howitzer
 L118 light gun 105 mm
 M119
 Self-propelled artillery
 FV433 Abbot SPG self-propelled 105 mm gun
 AS-90 155 mm self-propelled gun
 Mortars
 Ordnance ML 4.2 inch mortar
 Stokes mortar

United States 
 Anti-aircraft guns
 37 mm Gun M1
 3-inch Gun M1918
 90 mm Gun M1/M2/M3
 120 mm M1 gun
 5"/25 caliber gun
 5"/38 caliber gun
 M51 Skysweeper
 M167 VADS
 Self-propelled anti-aircraft guns
 M19 Multiple Gun Motor Carriage
 M163 VADS
 M42 Duster
 T249 Vigilante
 Anti-tank guns
 37 mm Gun M3
 M50 Ontos
 Tank destroyers
 M10 tank destroyer
 Mortars
 M1 mortar
 M2 mortar
 M2 4.2 inch mortar
 M29 mortar
 M30 mortar
 M120 120 mm mortar
 M224-60 mm mortar, in current US Army and Marine Corps service
 Dragon Fire 120 mm automated mortar
 Mortar carriers
 M84 Mortar Carrier
 M106-self-propelled 107 mm mortar
 M1064 mortar carrier
 M1129 Mortar Carrier
 Artillery
 Parrott rifle
 Rodman gun
 Dahlgren gun
 75 mm gun M2–M6 M2, M3, M6
 M1841 mountain howitzer
 M3 howitzer lightweight 105 mm howitzer for airborne troops
 3.2-inch gun M1897 pre-WWI field gun
 3-inch M1902 field gun pre-WWI field gun
 4.7 inch Gun M1906 pre-WWI field gun
 6-inch howitzer M1908 pre-WWI howitzer
 75 mm gun M1897A4, WWI-WWII era field gun, US-made version of French Canon de 75 modèle 1897
 75 mm howitzer M1/M116, 1920s-Vietnam era pack howitzer
 155 mm howitzer M1917 WWI-WWII era howitzer, a French Canon de 155 C modèle 1917 Schneider in US service
 155 mm howitzer M1918 WWI-WWII era howitzer, US-made version of French Canon de 155 C modèle 1917 Schneider
 155 mm gun M1918 WWI-WWII era field gun, US-made version of French Canon de 155mm GPF
 8-inch howitzer M1917, WWI-era US-made versions of British BL 8-inch howitzer Mk VI – VIII
 4.5-inch gun M1 WWII US field gun
 105 mm M2A1 (M101A1) howitzer WWII US standard light field gun
 105 mm M102 howitzer
 155 mm gun M1, M2, M59 a WWII and Korea era field gun widely known as the Long Tom
 8 inch howitzer M1 (M115) a towed, used by United States Army
 8-inch Gun M1 a WWII era 203 mm towed heavy gun
 M1918 240 mm howitzer WWI-WWII era siege gun derived from French Mortier de 280 modèle 1914 Schneider
 240 mm howitzer M1 WWII era towed howitzer
 155 mm M114/Howitzer M1 a WWII-1980s era towed howitzer used by the United States Army
 M198 155 mm howitzer
 M119 howitzer a lightweight British 105mm howitzer also used by the United States Army
 M777 155 mm medium howitzer
 Self-propelled artillery
 T92 Howitzer Motor Carriage experimental self-propelled 240 mm howitzer
 Howitzer Motor Carriage M8 self-propelled 75 mm pack howitzer
 M12 Gun Motor Carriage self-propelled 155 mm M1918 gun
 M40 Gun Motor Carriage self-propelled 155 mm M2 gun
 M42 Duster self-propelled twin 40 mm anti-aircraft cannon
 M44 self-propelled howitzer 155 mm
 M52 self propelled howitzer 105 mm
 M55 self propelled howitzer 155 mm
 M107 self-propelled gun 175 mm (6.9")
 M108 howitzer self-propelled 105 mm
 M109 howitzer self-propelled 155 mm
 XM2001 Crusader self-propelled 155 mm howitzer, proposed then cancelled
 M1299 self-propelled 155 mm howitzer prototype based on M109
 M55 howitzer self-propelled 203 mm (8") T108
 M110 howitzer self-propelled 203 mm
 M125 self-propelled 81 mm
 M163 Vulcan self-propelled 20 mm Vulcan Gatling cannon
 Nuclear artillery
 M65 atomic cannon 280 mm
 Recoilless rifles
 M18 recoilless rifle
 M20 recoilless rifle
 M27 recoilless rifle
 M40 recoilless rifle
 M67 recoilless rifle
 Davy Crockett (nuclear device)
 Rocket artillery
 M16 (rocket)
 M270 Multiple Launch Rocket System self-propelled loader/launcher
 M1064 mortar carrier self-propelled 120 mm
 XM70E2 towed 115mm multiple rocket launcher
 MGR-1 Honest John nuclear-capable rocket
 HIMARS self-propelled Multiple Launch Rocket System (MLRS)
 Long Range Precision Fires (LRPF).
 Coastal artillery
 3-inch gun M1903
 5-inch gun M1897
 6-inch gun M1897
 8-inch M1888
 8-inch Mk. VI railway gun
 10-inch gun M1895
 12-inch coast defense mortar
 12-inch gun M1895
 14-inch gun M1907
 14-inch M1920 railway gun
 16-inch gun M1895
 16-inch gun M1919
 16-inch howitzer M1920
 16"/50 caliber Mark 2 gun

United Arab Emirates 
 Rocket artillery
Jobaria Defense Systems Multiple Cradle Launcher
 Mortar carriers
 RG-31 Agrab; Mortar carrier version of RG-31 Nyala with SRAMS (Super Rapid Advanced Mortar System).

Yugoslavia - passed to successor states
 UB M-52 120 mm mortar
 M-63 Plamen
 RAK-12
 M-71 Partizan rocket launcher single-tube 128 mm
 M-77 Oganj self-propelled 32 tube 128 mm
 M-87 Orkan 12-tube 262 mm self-propelled multiple rocket launcher

References

See also
 List of artillery
 List of artillery by name
 List of artillery by type
 List of the largest cannon by caliber
 List of medieval and early modern gunpowder artillery
 List of siege artillery

Artillery
List
Country
Artillery